Kota Bharu (Kelantanese: Koto Baru; Jawi: كوت بهارو)   colloquially referred to as KB, is a town in Malaysia that serves as the state capital and royal seat of Kelantan. It is situated in the northeastern part of Peninsular Malaysia and lies near the mouth of the Kelantan River.

The town is home to many religious buildings, various museums, the unique architecture of the old royal palaces (still occupied by the sultan and sultanah and off-limits to visitors but viewable from outside) and former royal buildings (which can be visited). It is served by Keretapi Tanah Melayu's East Coast Line at the nearby Wakaf Bharu Terminal Station, in the town of Wakaf Bharu across the Kelantan River and Sultan Ismail Petra Airport, located in Pengkalan Chepa.

Etymology 
Kota Bharu means "new city" or "new castle/fort" in Malay. Occasionally, the name of the city is written as Kota Baharu.

History
Kota Bharu was founded during the late 19th century. Before the establishment, Kota Bharu was home to Kelantan's Royal Palace, then established by Sultan Muhammad II of Kelantan in 1844 as Kelantan's state capital who wanted the new state capital built in his honour. Prior to this, Kota Bharu was known as Kuala Kelantan. Before Kota Bharu assumed the role, the Kelantanese capital was divided into two which were Kota Kubang Labu and Kota Pengkalan Datu. During the 19th century, Kelantan was a prosperous and populous state with a population of around 30,000 to 50,000 people including a thousand Chinese. Production from within the state include gold, tin ore, black pepper, areca nut, rice, rattan, bamboo, agarwood and songket. Kota Bharu acts as entrepot for goods due to its strategic location beside the Kelantan River.

Japanese forces captured the city and would go on to successfully engage the British in jungle warfare and ultimately capture Singapore.

Kota Bharu was declared as the "Cultural City" on 25 July 1991 by the late Sultan Ismail Petra on the basis of two important aspects – the history of Kota Bharu and the uniqueness of its local arts and cultures. Kota Bharu was rebranded as the "Islamic City" by the Kelantan State Government on 1 October 2005 through its "Developing With Islam" policy.

Government

Kota Bharu Municipal Council, officially known as the Islamic City of Kota Bharu Municipal Council (Jawi: مجليس ڤربندرن كوتا بهارو بندراي اسلام) and formerly known as the Kota Bharu Town Council from 1936 until 1971 and the Kota Bharu Town Board from 1971 until 1978, is the local authority of Kota Bharu.

Demographics
The vast majority of Kota Bharu's population is ethnically Kelantanese Malay. The language spoken in Kota Bharu is Kelantan Malay dialect. There is also a fairly large Chinese population.

Religion
Kota Bharu town's population is 93% Muslim, with the remainder consisting of Buddhists, Hindus and Christians. The predominantly urban local Chinese community mainly practices Buddhism.

Culture

The Kelantanese culture is highly distinctive as compared to other states of Malaysia but also with some influences from Thailand due to its geographical proximity.

Food
Nasi berlauk, nasi dagang, nasi lemak and nasi kerabu are popular elements of the local cuisine. Sweet cakes, or kuih, are also popular amongst the Kelantanese. Other popular foods include nasi tumpang, etok, akok, lompat tikam & netbak.

Climate 
Kota Bharu features a tropical monsoon climate bordering on a tropical rainforest climate. Kota Bharu does not have a true dry season although the city experiences noticeably heavier rainfall from August through January.

Transportation

Public transportation
Grab Car services, available for 24 hours a day, are provided in Kota Bharu since April 2017.

Kota Bharu is serviced by Sultan Ismail Petra Airport, the busiest airport in east coast of Peninsular Malaysia (IATA: KBR).

The closest railway station is the Wakaf Bharu station on the other side of the river, 6 km from the city centre.

The under construction MRL East Coast Rail Link will have a station at Kota Bahru. The Kota Bharu station will be located near Kampung Tunjong.

Roadways
Highway 8 is the main highway leading Kota Bharu to the federal capital Kuala Lumpur. Highway 3 connects Kota Bharu to Pasir Mas and the Thailand border in the west, or Kuala Terengganu, Kuantan or even Johor Bahru due south. Connection to Penang is possible via highway 4. The Lebuhraya Rakyat, or People's Expressway, is a planned expressway that is to connect Kota Bharu to Kuala Krai in southern Kelantan. The project has been integrated into the Central Spine Road project (assigned as highway 34), scheduled to be complete by 2020.

Education 
Notable educational establishments include Open University Malaysia, Universiti Tun Abdul Razak, MSU College and Wadi Sofia International School. However, the most plentiful type of school are national schools, which include

 Private schools
 Islamic religious schools
 National schools
 Chinese Type Primary and Secondary School
 Technical secondary schools: Sekolah Menengah Teknik (SMT)
 MRSM and SBP

Shopping 

The most famous shopping destination in Kota Bharu is Siti Khadijah Market. Most of its sellers are women. Next to Central Market is the Kota Bharu Trade Centre (KBTC) which was opened in August 2009, with Parkson as the anchor tenants for the mall.

Other shopping centres in Kota Bharu are the KB Mall, Kota Seri Mutiara, G-Orange Mall, Pantai Timur and Platinum Mall. A new Tesco hypermarket opened in 2008 but current Tesco change name to Lotus. In March 2010, the Mydin Mall in Bandar Baru Kubang Kerian opened. AEON Mall in Lembah Sireh opened in April 2016. A new Giant Hypermarket located in Bandar Baru Tunjong was opened in 2016, as well as a Mydin store at Bandar Baru Tunjong by 2021.

Tourism

Beaches 
Strong surf threatens all major beaches in the vicinity of Kota Bharu with substantial erosion. The community has been implementing wave breakers by piling up massive amounts of boulders in an effort to protect the coastline. Regular beach activity has become impossible as visitors frequent beaches further south. In terms of tourism, the most famous beach in Kota Bharu is Pantai Cahaya Bulan.

Wreck diving 
Diving in Kota Bharu is a relatively new activity. At present, only one dive shop operates in the area. Trips out to the wreck of the IJN Awazisan Maru (known locally as the "Japanese Invasion Wreck") are among the sites offered. This Japanese transport ship was the very first vessel to sink in the Pacific War. The wreck is a 30-minute boat journey from a jetty which is 10 minutes outside of Kota Bharu.

Notable people

Academician & Corporate Figures
 Omar Abdul Rahman
 Nik Safiah Karim
Athletes
 Badhri Radzi, footballer. Currently playing for Kelantan FA
 Hafiz Hashim, former national badminton player.
 Khairul Fahmi Che Mat, national football goalkeeper
 Luqman Hakim Shamsudin, footballer. Currently playing for KV Kortrijk
 Mohd Hashim Mustapha, former footballer
 Roslin Hashim, former national badminton player.
 Sidique Ali Merican, former sprinter.
Entertainers
 Bienda
 Izzue Islam
 Issey Fazlisham
 Misha Omar
 Julia Rais
 Nelydia Senrose
 Neelofa
 Saharul Ridzuan
Politics
 Asri Muda
 Khalid Samad
 Mohamed Nasir
 Ng Yen Yen
 Nga Kor Ming
 Nik Ahmad Kamil
 Nik Aziz Nik Mat
 Tan Seng Giaw
 Tengku Razaleigh Hamzah
 Zaid Ibrahim
 Tengku Maimun Tuan Mat

International relations

Sister city
, Kota Bharu has two sister city:
  Kasaoka, Japan.
  Linxia Hui ,China

References

External links

 
 
 Kelantan at Tourism Malaysia

 
Populated places established in 1844
World War II sites in British Malaya